In computing, a minimal reproducible example (abbreviated MRE) is a collection of source code and other data files which allow a bug or problem to be demonstrated and reproduced. The important feature of a minimal reproducible example is that it is as small and as simple as possible, such that it is just sufficient to demonstrate the problem, but without any additional complexity or dependencies which will make resolution harder.

A minimal reproducible example may also be referred to as a minimal working example (MWE), a minimal complete verifiable example (MCVE), or a short self-contained correct example (SSCCE).

External links 
 How to create a Minimal, Reproducible Example - Help Center - Stack Overflow and MCVExit redux
 Short but complete programs (Jon Skeet)
 What is a minimal working example? (guidelines for users of LaTeX)
 Short Self Contained Correct (Compilable) Example

Debugging